Bedford Charter Township is a charter township located in the northwest corner of Calhoun County in the U.S. state of Michigan. It is part of the Battle Creek, Michigan Metropolitan Statistical Area. As of the 2010 census, the township population was 9,357. Most of the township lies north of the Kalamazoo River and the city of Battle Creek. Three small noncontiguous areas of the township lie south of the Kalamazoo River.

History
Bedford Township was first organized in 1839. As of 1910 it had a population of 2,076.

Communities
Much of the township is considered to be part of the Battle Creek urban area, and the township's economy is closely linked to the city. The township became a charter township in part to protect against further annexation by the city.
Level Park-Oak Park is a census-designated place, covering an area along M-89, just north of the Kalamazoo River and just northwest of Battle Creek. It includes the unincorporated communities of Level Park and Oak Park which are adjacent areas along M-89.
Morgan Corners and Orchard Park are both settlements located along the eastern boundary with Pennfield Charter Township. Most of Orchard Park has been incorporated into Battle Creek.

Geography

Demographics

As of the census of 2000, there were 9,517 people, 3,667 households, and 2,651 families residing in the township. The racial makeup of the township was 84.05% White, 12.09% African American, 0.34% Native American, 0.43% Asian, 0.06% Pacific Islander, 0.85% from other races, and 2.18% from two or more races. Hispanic or Latino of any race were 1.49% of the population.

There were 3,667 households, out of which 30.1% had children under the age of 18 living with them, 55.9% were married couples living together, 12.4% had a female householder with no husband present, and 27.7% were non-families. 22.5% of all households were made up of individuals, and 8.9% had someone living alone who was 65 years of age or older.  The average household size was 2.52 and the average family size was 2.94.

In the township the population was spread out, with 24.1% under the age of 18, 7.0% from 18 to 24, 26.9% from 25 to 44, 27.4% from 45 to 64, and 14.5% who were 65 years of age or older.  The median age was 40 years. For every 100 females, there were 101.8 males.  For every 100 females age 18 and over, there were 98.7 males.

The median income for a household in the township was $44,462, and the median income for a family was $51,230. Males had a median income of $37,331 versus $26,435 for females. The per capita income for the township was $20,303.  About 4.3% of families and 5.8% of the population were below the poverty line, including 4.5% of those under age 18 and 6.2% of those age 65 or over.

Notable people
 Eudora Stone Bumstead (1860–1892), poet, hymnwriter

References

External links
Bedford Charter Township official website

Townships in Calhoun County, Michigan
Charter townships in Michigan
1839 establishments in Michigan
Populated places established in 1839